The Lanarkshire Junior Football League was a football league competition operated in Lanarkshire under the Scottish Junior Football Association which operated from 1891, being the oldest-running regional competition of its kind until a merger in 1968.

The league was formed in 1891, at which point six of the ten finalists in the 5-year history of the Scottish Junior Cup had been from Lanarkshire (not counting those in the city of Glasgow under its boundaries of the time) indicating a strong presence at Junior level, with teams forming in many towns and villages involved in the thriving coal mining and steelworking industries. However, by 1895 a rival Glasgow Junior Football League was formed, and that quickly became a superior competition due to the abundance of players, higher attendances and lower costs associated with travelling. The proximity of the big city also caused problems for the Lanarkshire league organisers, with the clubs based in their territory consistently seeking to join the GJL, while the short distances involved made it feasible to do so whenever they were considered a useful addition. Some Lanarkshire clubs also switched between their local league and the Scottish Junior Football League, which had no specific territory but also existed in the shadow of the Glasgow-based league until it folded in the 1940s.

Unlike the GJL and the Western Junior Football League (the equivalent based in Ayrshire), the Lanarkshire league was not involved in the Intermediate dispute relating to compensation payments due to clubs joining Scottish Football League teams, although several of its members defected to the rebel group, some never returning; during those clubs' four-year absence from the Scottish Junior Cup, Lanarkshire's Burnbank Athletic reached the final twice. When then dispute was resolved in 1931, a new regional knockout tournament, the West of Scotland Junior Cup, was carried over from the Intermediate setup, and after a few years the Lanarkshire league clubs were invited to take part, although as in the Scottish Cup, teams were involved in the latter stages only occasionally (5 wins in 34 editions), the competition being dominated by the GJL's successor, the Central League. Unlike most of Junior football, the Lanarkshire league went into abeyance for five years during World War II, with clubs playing in the 'Lanark & Lothians Junior League' during the conflict.

In 1968 the Junior football system across Scotland was reorganised, with Lanarkshire's league (which now only had ten member clubs due to defections, and several clubs folding as traditional industries declined and entire communities dispersed) merging into the Central setup. It was the first Scottish Junior league to be established, at the time of its dissolution it was the longest-running.

Champions
Key:

Notes

List of winners

{| class="wikitable sortable" style="text-align: center; font-size:100%"
|-
! Club
! Winners
! Runners-up
! First win
! Last win
|-
|Burnbank Athletic
| 10
| 1
|1896–97 
|1946–47
|-
|Shotts Bon Accord 
| 7
| 2
|1957–58 
|1967–68
|-
|Larkhall Thistle
| 6
| 8''
|1895–96 
|1951–52
|-
|Blantyre Victoria
| 6
| 2
|1892–93 
|1926–27
|-
|Thorniewood United
| 4
| 4
|1950–51 
|1963–64
|-
|Carluke Rovers
| 3
| 6
|1922–23 
|1958–59
|-
| Wishaw Juniors
| 3
| 3
|1925–26 
|1945–46
|-
|Dalziel Rovers
| 3
| 2
|1897–98 
|1904–05
|-
| Royal Albert Athletic
| 3
| 1
|1933–34 
|1936–37
|-
|Cleland
| 3
| 1
|1917–18 
|1921–22
|-
|Larkhall United
| 2
| 2
|1909–10 
|1914–15
|-
|Douglas Water Thistle
| 2
| 2
|1932–33 
|1954–55
|-
|Quarter Huttonbank
| 2
| 1
|1907–08 
|1908–09
|-
|New Stevenston
| 2
| 0
|1939–40 
|1949–50
|-
|Shotts United 
| 2
| 0
|1923–24 
|1924–25
|-
|Coalburn United
| 2
| 0
|1927–28 
|1929–30
|-
|Blantyre Celtic
| 1
| 3
|colspan=2|1916–17 
|-
|Coltness United
| 1
| 3
|colspan=2|1953–54 
|-
|Forth Wanderers
| 1
| 2
|colspan=2|1965–66 
|-
| Stonehouse Violet
| 1
| 2
|colspan=2|1938–39
|-
|Mossend Celtic
| 1
| 1
|colspan=2|1894–95
|-
|Newarthill Hearts
| 1
| 1
|colspan=2|1948–49
|-
|Shotts Battlefield
| 1
| 1
|colspan=2|1978–79 
|-
|Holytown Thistle
| 1
| 1
|colspan=2|1899–1900 
|-
| Lesmahagow
| 1
| 0
|colspan=2|1952–53 
|-
|East Benhar Heatherbell
| 1
| 0
|colspan=2|1906–07
|-
|Newmains Thistle
| 1
| 0
|colspan=2|1891–92
|-
|Holytown United
| 1
| 0
|colspan=2|1937–38 
|-
|Mossend Hibernian
| 0
| 4
|colspan=2|N/A
|-
|Longriggend Wanderers
| 0
| 3
|colspan=2|N/A
|-
|Bellshill Athletic
| 0
| 2
|colspan=2|N/A
|-
|Fauldhouse United
| 0
| 2
|colspan=2|N/A
|-
|Cadzow Oak
| 0
| 2
|colspan=2|N/A
|-
|Cadzow St Anne's
| 0
| 2
|colspan=2|N/A
|-
|Lanark United
| 0
| 1
|colspan=2|N/A
|-
|Cleland Rangers
| 0
| 1
|colspan=2|N/A
|-
|Fauldhouse West Rovers
| 0
| 1
|colspan=2|N/A
|-
|Haywood Wanderers
| 0
| 1
|colspan=2|N/A
|-
|Mount Ellon United
| 0
| 1
|colspan=2|N/A
|-
|Newton Villa
| 0
| 1
|colspan=2|N/A
|-
|}Notes'''

References

 Scottish Junior FA Structure, Scottish Junior Football Association

1891 establishments in Scotland
1968 disestablishments in Scotland
Sports leagues established in 1891
Sports leagues disestablished in 1968
Defunct Scottish Junior Football Association leagues
Football in South Lanarkshire
Football in North Lanarkshire
Scottish Junior Football Association, West Region